Mayar Sherif was the defending champion but lost to Claire Liu in the second round.

Liu went on to win the title, defeating Madison Brengle in the final, 6–2, 7–6(8–6).

Seeds

Draw

Finals

Top half

Bottom half

References

Main Draw

LTP Charleston Pro Tennis - Singles
LTP Charleston Pro Tennis